Andrew Jolivétte is an American sociologist and author. He is a professor at the University of California, San Diego, where he is chair of the department of Ethnic Studies. He is the co-chair of UC Ethnic Studies Council.

Background 
Andrew James Jolivette was born in San Francisco in 1975 to Annetta Donna Foster Jolivette and Kenneth Louis Jolivette. He grew up in San Francisco. He identifies as being of Louisiana Creole descent.

Jolivette is a member of the Atakapa-Ishak Nation of Louisiana, a nonprofit organization based in Lake Charles, Louisiana, that is an unrecognized tribe. While the organization claims descent from Atakapa, also known as Ishak, it is neither a federally recognized tribe or a state-recognized tribe.

Education 
Jolivette earned his bachelor's degree in sociology with a minor in English literature and a certificate in ethnic studies from the University of San Francisco. He earned his master's degree in sociology from San Francisco State University in 1999. His thesis was titled, "Native America: White Indians, Black Indians and the Contemporary Privilege of Color." He earned his doctoral degree in sociology from the University of California, Santa Cruz in 2003, with a dissertation titled "Creole Diaspora: (Re)articulating the Social, Legal, Economic, and Regional Construction of American Indian Identity."

Career 
Jolivétte was a professor and chair of the American Indian studies department at San Francisco State University from 2010 to 2016.

He became the founding Director of the Native American and Indigenous Studies (NAIS) Program at the University of California, San Diego, in 2020. The NAIS Program includes a minor and a graduate certificate and an elder/culture bearer-in-residence program. He served as a historian of the Atakapa-Ishak Nation, an unrecognized tribe, from 2005 to 2010. He co-founded and is co-chair of the University of California Ethnic Studies Council which works to advance and support ethnic studies curriculum and programs across the state of California and the United States.

Bibliography

Anthologies 
 Crash Course: Reflections on the Film Crash for Critical Dialogues About Race, Power, and Privilege, ed. Michael Benitez Jr. and Felicia Gustin (2007).
 John Brown Childs, Hurricane Katrina: Response and Responsibilities, ed. John Brown Childs (2005)
 "Critical Mixed Race Studies: New Approaches to Resistance and Social Justice," in Color Struck: Essays on Race and Ethnicity in Global Perspective, ed. Julius Adekunle and Hettie V Williams (2010).

References

External links
 Andrew Jolivétte, PhD, Social Innovation & University Opportunity Lab

Living people
1975 births
African-American academics
American non-fiction writers
American people of Creole descent
American people who self-identify as being of Native American descent
American sociologists
San Francisco State University alumni
San Francisco State University faculty
University of San Francisco alumni
21st-century African-American people
20th-century African-American people